Rodgersia pinnata is a species of flowering plant in the family Saxifragaceae, native to the Sichuan and Yunnan provinces of China. The flowers are white.

Cultivars may have white, cream, pink or red flowers. Red cultivars include 'Fireworks'.

The following cultivars have won the Royal Horticultural Society's Award of Garden Merit:
'Elegans' 
'Irish Bronze' 
'Superba'

References

Bibliography 

 
 
 

Saxifragaceae